The 1923 Wisconsin Badgers football team was an American football team that represented the University of Wisconsin in the 1923 Big Ten Conference football season. The team compiled a 3–3–1 record (1–3–1 against conference opponents), finished in seventh place in the Big Ten Conference, and outscored its opponents by a combined total of 89 to 32. John J. Ryan was in his first year as Wisconsin's head coach.

Marty Below was the team captain. Below was also a consensus first-team player on the 1923 College Football All-America Team. Guard Adolph Bieberstein and fullback Merrill Taft were selected by Billy Evans for his "National Honor Roll" of the best players in the country.

The team played its home games at Camp Randall Stadium, which had a seating capacity of 14,000. During the 1923 season, the average attendance at home games was 16,387.

Schedule

References

Wisconsin
Wisconsin Badgers football seasons
Wisconsin Badgers football